Peter Bercovitch,  (September 17, 1879 – December 26, 1942) was a Canadian provincial and federal politician.

Born in Montreal, Quebec, the son of Hyman Bercovitch and Fannie Goldberg, he received a Bachelor of Civil Law from McGill University and a Master of Laws from the Université de Montréal. He was called to the Quebec Bar in 1901 and was created a King's Counsel in 1911. He practised law in Montreal and became a senior partner of the law firm Bercovitch, Cohen and Spector.

He was elected to the Legislative Assembly of Quebec representing the riding of Montréal–Saint-Louis for the Liberal party in the 1916 Quebec election. He was re-elected in 1919 (by acclamation), 1923, 1927, 1931, 1935 (by acclamation), and 1936. He resigned in 1938 and was acclaimed to the House of Commons of Canada representing the riding of Cartier for the Liberal party in a 1938 by-election and was re-elected in the 1940 federal election. He died in office in late 1942.

References
 Peter Bercovitch fonds at Library and Archives Canada.

External links
 

1879 births
1942 deaths
Jewish Canadian politicians
Liberal Party of Canada MPs
Members of the House of Commons of Canada from Quebec
Politicians from Montreal
Quebec Liberal Party MNAs
Université de Montréal alumni
Anglophone Quebec people
Canadian King's Counsel
20th-century Canadian legislators
McGill University Faculty of Law alumni